Italy participated in the Junior Eurovision Song Contest 2016 which took place on 20 November 2016, in Valletta, Malta. The Italian broadcaster Rai Gulp, which is a channel owned by Radiotelevisione Italiana (RAI) was responsible for organising their entry for the contest. Fiamma Boccia was internally selected to represent Italy with the song "Cara Mamma (Dear Mom)". Italy placed third in the contest with 209 points.

Background

Before Junior Eurovision
The Italian broadcaster announced on 2 June 2016, that they would be participating at the contest which takes place on 20 November 2016, in Valletta, Malta. The method for selecting their entrant and song was done internally by the national broadcaster, RAI. On 11 October 2016, it was announced that Fiamma Boccia would be representing Italy at the contest with the song "Cara Mamma (Dear Mom)".

Artist and song information

Fiamma Boccia
Fiamma (born 25 November 2003) is an Italian singer. She represented Italy at the Junior Eurovision Song Contest 2016 in Valletta, Malta, on 20 November 2016 with the song "Cara Mamma", placing third with 209 points.

Cara Mamma (Dear Mom)
"Cara Mamma" is a song by Italian singer Fiamma Boccia. It represented Italy during the Junior Eurovision Song Contest 2016. It is composed by Marco Iardella, Francesco Spadoni and Alessandro Ghironi, while the lyrics were written by Marco Iardella, Francesco Spadoni and Fiamma Boccia herself.

At Junior Eurovision
During the opening ceremony and the running order draw which took place on 14 November 2016, Italy was drawn to perform eleventh on 20 November 2016, following Ukraine and preceding Serbia.

Final

Italy came third in the final, with 209 points. This is their second best placing after Vincenzo Cantiello's first place in 2014.

Voting
During the press conference for the Junior Eurovision Song Contest 2016, held in Stockholm, the Reference Group announced several changes to the voting format for the 2016 contest. Previously, points had been awarded based on a combination of 50% National juries and 50% televoting, with one more set of points also given out by a 'Kids' Jury'. For the first time since the inauguration of the contest the voting procedure will not include a public televote. Following these results, three expert jurors will also announce their points from 1–8, 10, and 12. These professional jurors are: Christer Björkman, Mads Grimstad, and Jedward.

References

Italy
Junior
Junior Eurovision Song Contest